Northern Windows is an album by jazz pianist and keyboardist Hampton Hawes recorded for the Prestige label in 1974.

Reception

The Allmusic site awarded the album 4 stars.

Track listing
All compositions by Hampton Hawes except as indicated
 "Sierra Morena" - 3:52   
 "Go Down Moses" (Traditional) - 6:29   
 "Bach" - 2:59   
 "Web" - 3:32   
 "Tune Axle Grease" - 5:05   
 "C & H Sugar" - 11:36

Personnel
Hampton Hawes - piano, electric piano
Allen DeRienzo, Snooky Young - trumpet
George Bohanon - trombone
Bill Green, Jackie Kelso, Jay Migliori - saxophones, flute
Carol Kaye - electric bass
Spider Webb - drums
David Axelrod - arranger, conductor

References

Hampton Hawes albums
1974 albums
Prestige Records albums
Albums produced by David Axelrod (musician)